Events from the year 1814 in Denmark.

Incumbents
 Monarch – Frederick VI
 Prime minister – Frederik Moltke, Fredrik Julius Kaas, Joachim Godske Moltke

Events
 14 January – The signing of the Treaty of Kiel
 The Gunboat War ends.
 Helgoland is ceded to the United Kingdom.
 Kingdom of Norway is ceded to the King of Sweden, ending the Danish-Norwegian Union.
 Anholt is returned to Denmark.
 Faroe Islands, Greenland and Iceland becomes a part of Denmark.

Sports
 2 August  The 1914 UCI Track Cycling World Championships are held in Copenhagen.

Births
 7 May – Christian Julius Hansen, composer, organist, voice teacher and choirmaster (died 1875)
 9 May – Princess Marie Luise Charlotte of Hesse-Kassel (died 1895)
 24 November – Adolph Hannover, physician (died 1894)

Deaths
 14 June – Frederick Christian II, Duke, prince and feudal magnate (born 1765)

References

 
1810s in Denmark
Denmark
Years of the 19th century in Denmark